Polytheism is the belief in multiple deities, which are usually assembled into a pantheon of gods and goddesses, along with their own religious sects and rituals. Polytheism is a type of theism. Within theism, it contrasts with monotheism, the belief in a singular God who is, in most cases, transcendent. In religions that accept polytheism, the different gods and goddesses may be representations of forces of nature or ancestral principles; they can be viewed either as autonomous or as aspects or emanations of a creator deity or transcendental absolute principle (monistic theologies), which manifests immanently in nature (panentheistic and pantheistic theologies). Polytheists do not always worship all the gods equally; they can be henotheists, specializing in the worship of one particular deity, or kathenotheists, worshiping different deities at different times.

Polytheism was the typical form of religion before the development and spread of the Abrahamic religions of Judaism, Christianity, and Islam, which enforce monotheism. It is well documented throughout history, from prehistory and the earliest records of ancient Egyptian religion and ancient Mesopotamian religion to the religions prevalent during Classical antiquity, such as ancient Greek religion and ancient Roman religion, and in ethnic religions such as Germanic, Slavic, and Baltic paganism and Native American religions.

Notable polytheistic religions practiced today include Taoism, Shenism or Chinese folk religion, Japanese Shinto, Santería, most Traditional African religions, various neopagan faiths such as Wicca. Hinduism, while popularly held as polytheistic, cannot be exclusively categorised as such as some Hindus consider themselves to be pantheists and others consider themselves to be monotheists. Both are compatible with Hindu texts, since there exists no consensus of standardisation in the faith. Vedanta, the most dominant school of Hinduism, offers a combination of monotheism and polytheism, holding that Brahman is the sole ultimate reality of the universe, yet unity with it can be reached by worshipping multiple gods and goddesses.

Terminology
The term comes from the Greek πολύ poly ("many") and θεός theos ("god") and was coined by the Jewish writer Philo of Alexandria to argue with the Greeks. When Christianity spread throughout Europe and the Mediterranean, non-Christians were just called Gentiles (a term originally used by Jews to refer to non-Jews) or pagans (locals) or by the clearly pejorative term idolaters (worshippers of "false" gods). In modern times, the term polytheism was first revived in French by Jean Bodin in 1580, followed by Samuel Purchas's usage in English in 1614.

Soft versus hard

A major division in modern polytheistic practices is between so-called soft polytheism and hard polytheism.

"Soft" polytheism is the belief that different gods may either be psychological archetypes, personifications of natural forces, or as being one essential god interpreted though the lenses of different cultures (e.x. Odin, Zeus, and Indra all being the same god as interpreted by Germanic, Greek, and Indic peoples respectively) – known as omnitheism. In this way, gods may be interchangeable for one another across cultures.

"Hard" polytheism is the belief that gods are distinct, separate, real divine beings, rather than psychological archetypes or personifications of natural forces. Hard polytheists reject the idea that "all gods are one essential god" and may also reject the existence of gods outside their own pantheon altogether.

Gods and divinity

The deities of polytheism are often portrayed as complex personages of greater or lesser status, with individual skills, needs, desires and histories, in many ways similar to humans (anthropomorphic) in their personality traits, but with additional individual powers, abilities, knowledge or perceptions.
Polytheism cannot be cleanly separated from the animist beliefs prevalent in most folk religions. The gods of polytheism are in many cases the highest order of a continuum of supernatural beings or spirits, which may include ancestors, demons, wights, and others. In some cases these spirits are divided into celestial or chthonic classes, and belief in the existence of all these beings does not imply that all are worshipped.

Types of deities

Types of deities often found in polytheism may include:
 Creator deity
 Culture hero
 Death deity (chthonic)
 Life-death-rebirth deity
 Love goddess
 Mother goddess
 Political deity (such as a king or emperor)
 Sky deity (celestial)
 Solar deity
 Trickster deity
 Water deity
 Lunar deity
 Deities of music, arts, science, farming, or other endeavors

Religion and mythology

In the Classical era, 4th century CE Neoplatonist Sallustius categorized mythology into five types:
 Theological: myths that contemplate the essence of the gods, such as Cronus swallowing his children, which Sallustius regarded as expressing in allegory the essence of divinity
 Physical: expressing the activities of gods in the world
 Psychological: myths as allegories of the activities of the soul itself or the soul's acts of thought
 Material: regarding material objects as gods, for example: to call the earth Gaia, the ocean Okeanos, or heat Typhon
 Mixed

The beliefs of many historical polytheistic religions are commonly referred to as "mythology", though the stories cultures tell about their gods should be distinguished from their worship or religious practice. For instance, deities portrayed in conflict in mythology were often nonetheless worshipped side by side, illustrating the distinction within the religion between belief and practice. Scholars such as Jaan Puhvel, J. P. Mallory, and Douglas Q. Adams have reconstructed aspects of the ancient Proto-Indo-European religion from which the religions of the various Indo-European peoples are thought to derive, which is believed to have been an essentially naturalist numenistic religion. An example of a religious notion from this shared past is the concept of *dyēus, which is attested in several religious systems of Indo-European-speaking peoples.

Ancient and historical religions
Well-known historical polytheistic pantheons include the Sumerian gods, the Egyptian gods, the pantheon attested in Classical Antiquity (in ancient Greek and Roman religion), the Norse Æsir and Vanir, the Yoruba Orisha, and the Aztec gods.

In many civilizations, pantheons tended to grow over time. Deities first worshipped as the patrons of cities or other places came to be collected together as empires extended over larger territories. Conquests could lead to the subordination of a culture's pantheon to that of the invaders, as in the Greek Titanomachia, and possibly also the Æsir–Vanir war in the Norse mythos. Cultural exchange could lead to "the same" deity being revered in two places under different names, as seen with the Greeks, Etruscans, and Romans, and also to the cultural transmission of elements of an extraneous religion, as with the ancient Egyptian deity Osiris, who was later worshipped in ancient Greece.

Most ancient belief systems held that gods influenced human lives. However, the Greek philosopher Epicurus held that the gods were incorruptible but material, blissful beings who inhabited the empty spaces between worlds and did not trouble themselves with the affairs of mortals, but could be perceived by the mind, especially during sleep.

Ancient Greece

The classical scheme in Ancient Greece of the Twelve Olympians (the Canonical Twelve of art and poetry) were: Zeus, Hera, Poseidon, Athena, Ares, Demeter, Apollo, Artemis, Hephaestus, Aphrodite, Hermes, and Hestia. Though it is suggested that Hestia stepped down when Dionysus was invited to Mount Olympus, this is a matter of controversy. Robert Graves' The Greek Myths cites two sources that obviously do not suggest Hestia surrendered her seat, though he suggests she did. Hades was often excluded because he dwelt in the underworld. All of the gods had a power. There was, however, a great deal of fluidity as to whom was counted among their number in antiquity. Different cities often worshipped the same deities, sometimes with epithets that distinguished them and specified their local nature.

Hellenic Polytheism extended beyond mainland Greece, to the islands and coasts of Ionia in Asia Minor, to Magna Graecia (Sicily and southern Italy), and to scattered Greek colonies in the Western Mediterranean, such as Massalia (Marseille). Greek religion tempered Etruscan cult and belief to form much of the later Roman religion. During the Hellenistic Era, philosophical schools like Epicureanism developed distinct theologies. Hellenism is, in practice, primarily centered around polytheistic and animistic worship.

Folk religions

The majority of so-called "folk religions" in the world today (distinguished from traditional ethnic religions) are found in the Asia-Pacific region. This fact conforms to the trend of the majority of polytheist religions being found outside the western world.

Folk religions are often closely tied to animism. Animistic beliefs are found in historical and modern cultures. Folk beliefs are often labeled superstitions when they are present in monotheistic societies. Folk religions often do not have organized authorities, also known as priesthoods, or any formal sacred texts. They often coincide with other religions as well. Abrahamic monotheistic religions, which dominate the western world, typically do not approve of practicing parts of multiple religions, but folk religions often overlap with others. Followers of polytheistic religions do not often problematize following practices and beliefs from multiple religions.

Modern religions

Buddhism

Buddhism is typically classified as non-theistic, but depending on the type of Buddhism practiced, it may be seen as polytheistic as it at least acknowledges the existence of multiple gods. The Buddha is a leader figure but is not meant to be worshipped as a god. Devas, a Sanskrit word for gods, are also not meant to be worshipped. They are not immortal and have limited powers. They may have been humans who had positive karma in their life and were reborn as a deva.
A common Buddhist practice is tantra, which is the use of rituals to achieve enlightenment. Tantra focuses on seeing yourself as a deity, and the use of deities as symbols rather than supernatural agents.
Buddhism is most closely aligned with polytheism when it is linked with other religions, often folk religions. For example, the Japanese Shinto religion, in which deities called kami are worshipped, is sometimes mixed with Buddhism.

Christianity

Although Christianity is usually described as a monotheistic religion, it is sometimes claimed that Christianity is not truly monotheistic because of its idea of the Trinity. The Trinity believes that God consists of the Father, the Son and the Holy Spirit. Because the deity is in three parts, some people believe Christianity should be considered a form of Tritheism or Polytheism. Christians contend that "one God exists in Three Persons and One Substance," but that a deity cannot be a person, who has one individual identity. Christianity inherited the idea of one God from Judaism, and maintains that its monotheistic doctrine is central to the faith.

Jordan Paper, a Western scholar and self-described polytheist, considers polytheism to be the normal state in human culture. He argues that "Even the Catholic Church shows polytheistic aspects with the 'veneration' of the saints." On the other hand, he complains, monotheistic missionaries and scholars were eager to see a proto-monotheism or at least henotheism in polytheistic religions, for example, when taking from the Chinese pair of Sky and Earth only one part and calling it the King of Heaven, as Matteo Ricci did. In 1508, a London Lollard named William Pottier was accused of believing in six gods.

Mormonism

Joseph Smith, the founder of the Latter Day Saint movement, believed in "the plurality of Gods", saying "I have always declared God to be a distinct personage, Jesus Christ a separate and distinct personage from God the Father, and that the Holy Ghost was a distinct personage and a Spirit: and these three constitute three distinct personages and three Gods". Mormonism, which emerged from Protestantism,  teaches exaltation defined as the idea that people can become like god in the afterlife. Mormonism also affirms the existence of a Heavenly Mother, and the prevailing view among Mormons is that God the Father was once a man who lived on a planet with his own higher God, and who became perfect after following this higher God. Some critics of Mormonism argue that statements in the Book of Mormon describe a trinitarian conception of God (e.g.), but were superseded by later revelations. Due to teachings within Mormon cosmology, some theologians claim that it allows for an infinite number of gods.

Mormons teach that scriptural statements on the unity of the Father, the Son, and the Holy Ghost represent a oneness of purpose, not of substance. They believe that the early Christian church did not characterize divinity in terms of an immaterial, formless shared substance until post-apostolic theologians began to incorporate Greek metaphysical philosophies (such as Neoplatonism) into Christian doctrine. Mormons believe that the truth about God's nature was restored through modern day revelation, which reinstated the original Judeo-Christian concept of a natural, corporeal, immortal God, who is the literal Father of the spirits of humans. It is to this personage alone that Mormons pray, as He is and always will be their Heavenly Father, the supreme "God of gods" (Deuteronomy 10:17). In the sense that Mormons worship only God the Father, they consider themselves monotheists. Nevertheless, Mormons adhere to Christ's teaching that those who receive God's word can obtain the title of "gods" (John 10:33–36), because as literal children of God they can take upon themselves His divine attributes. Mormons teach that "The glory of God is intelligence" (Doctrine and Covenants 93:36), and that it is by sharing the Father's perfect comprehension of all things that both Jesus Christ and the Holy Spirit are also divine.

Hinduism

Hinduism is not a monolithic religion: a wide variety of religious traditions and practices are grouped together under this umbrella term and some modern scholars have questioned the legitimacy of unifying them artificially and suggest that one should speak of "Hinduisms" in the plural. Theistic Hinduism encompasses both monotheistic and polytheistic tendencies and variations on or mixes of both structures.

Hindus venerate deities in the form of the murti, or idol. The Puja (worship) of the murti is like a way to communicate with the formless, abstract divinity (Brahman in Hinduism) which creates, sustains and dissolves creation. However, there are sects who have advocated that there is no need of giving a shape to God and that it is omnipresent and beyond the things which human can see or feel tangibly. Especially the Arya Samaj founded by Swami Dayananda Saraswati and Brahmo Samaj founded by Ram Mohan Roy (there are others also) do not worship deities. Arya Samaj favours Vedic chants and Havan, while Brahmo Samaj stresses simple prayers.

Some Hindu philosophers and theologians argue for a transcendent metaphysical structure with a single divine essence. This divine essence is usually referred to as Brahman or Atman, but the understanding of the nature of this absolute divine essence is the line which defines many Hindu philosophical traditions such as Vedanta.

Among lay Hindus, some believe in different deities emanating from Brahman, while others practice more traditional polytheism and henotheism, focusing their worship on one or more personal deities, while granting the existence of others.

Academically speaking, the ancient Vedic scriptures, upon which Hinduism is derived, describe four authorized disciplic lines of teaching coming down over thousands of years. (Padma Purana). Four of them propound that the Absolute Truth is Fully Personal, as in Judeo-Christian theology. They say that the Primal Original God is Personal, both transcendent and immanent throughout creation. He can be, and is often approached through worship of Murtis, called "Archa-Vigraha", which are described in the Vedas as identical with His various dynamic, spiritual Forms. This is the Vaisnava theology.

The fifth disciplic line of Vedic spirituality, founded by Adi Shankaracharya, promotes the concept that the Absolute is Brahman, without clear differentiations, without will, without thought, without intelligence.

In the Smarta denomination of Hinduism, the philosophy of Advaita expounded by Shankara allows veneration of numerous deities  with the understanding that all of them are but manifestations of one impersonal divine power, Brahman. Therefore, according to various schools of Vedanta including Shankara, which is the most influential and important Hindu theological tradition, there are a great number of deities in Hinduism, such as Vishnu, Shiva, Ganesha, Hanuman, Lakshmi, and Kali, but they are essentially different forms of the same "Being". However, many Vedantic philosophers also argue that all individuals were united by the same impersonal, divine power in the form of the Atman.

Many other Hindus, however, view polytheism as far preferable to monotheism. Ram Swarup, for example, points to the Vedas as being specifically polytheistic, and states that, "only some form of polytheism alone can do justice to this variety and richness." Sita Ram Goel, another 20th-century Hindu historian, wrote:

Some Hindus construe this notion of polytheism in the sense of polymorphism—one God with many forms or names. The Rig Veda, the primary Hindu scripture, elucidates this as follows:
They call him Indra, Mitra, Varuna, Agni, and he is heavenly nobly-winged Garutman. To what is One, sages give many a title they call it Agni, Yama, Matarisvan. Book I, Hymn 164, Verse 46 Rigveda

Zoroastrianism

Ahura Mazda is the supreme god, but Zoroastrianism does not deny other deities. Ahura Mazda has yazatas ("good agents") some of which include Anahita, Sraosha, Mithra, Rashnu, and Tishtrya. Richard Foltz has put forth evidence that Iranians of Pre-Islamic era worshiped all these figures, especially Mithra and Anahita.

Prods Oktor Skjærvø states Zoroastrianism is henotheistic, and "a dualistic and polytheistic religion, but with one supreme god, who is the father of the ordered cosmos". Other scholars state that this is unclear, because historic texts present a conflicting picture, ranging from Zoroastrianism's belief in "one god, two gods, or a best god henotheism".

Tengrism

The nature of Tengrism remains debatable. According to many scholars, Tengrism was originally polytheistic, but a monotheistic branch with the sky god Kök-Tengri as the supreme being evolved as a dynastical legitimation. It is at least agreed that Tengrism formed from the diverse folk religions of the local people and may have had diverse branches.

It is suggested that Tengrism was a monotheistic religion only at the imperial level in aristocratic circles,  and, perhaps, only by the 12th-13th centuries (a late form of development of ancient animistic shamanism in the era of the Mongol empire).

According to Jean-Paul Roux, the monotheistic concept evolved later out of a polytheistic system and was not the original form of Tengrism. The monotheistic concept helped to legitimate the rule of the dynasty: "As there is only one God in Heaven, there can only be one ruler on the earth ...".

Others point out that Tengri itself was never an Absolute, but only one of many gods of the upper world, the sky deity, of polytheistic shamanism, later known as Tengrism.

The term also describes several contemporary Turko-Mongolic native religious movements and teachings. All modern adherents of "political" Tengrism are monotheists.

Modern Paganism
Modern Paganism, also known as neopaganism and contemporary paganism, is a group of contemporary religious movements influenced by or claiming to be derived from the various historical pagan beliefs of pre-modern Europe. Although they have commonalities, contemporary pagan religious movements are diverse and no single set of beliefs, practices, or texts are shared by them all.

Founder of modern paganism Gerald Gardner helped to revive ancient polytheism. English occultist Dion Fortune was a major populiser of soft polytheism. In her novel The Sea Priestess, she wrote, "All gods are one god, and all goddesses are one goddess, and there is one initiator."

Reconstructionism

Reconstructionist polytheists apply scholarly disciplines such as history, archaeology and language study to revive ancient, traditional religions that have been fragmented, damaged or even destroyed, such as Norse Paganism, Roman and Celtic. A reconstructionist endeavors to revive and reconstruct an authentic practice, based on the ways of the ancestors but workable in contemporary life. These polytheists sharply differ from neopagans in that they consider their religion not only as inspired by historical religions but in many cases as a continuation or revival of those religions.

Wicca

Wicca is a duotheistic faith created by Gerald Gardner that allows for polytheism. Wiccans specifically worship the Lord and Lady of the Isles (their names are oathbound). It is an orthopraxic mystery religion that requires initiation to the priesthood in order to consider oneself Wiccan. Wicca emphasizes duality and the cycle of nature.

Serer

In Africa, polytheism in Serer religion dates to the Neolithic Era or possibly earlier, when the ancient ancestors of the Serer people represented their Pangool on the Tassili n'Ajjer. The supreme creator deity in Serer religion is Roog. However, there are many deities and Pangool (singular : Fangool, the interceders with the divine) in Serer religion. Each one has its own purpose and serves as Roog's agent on Earth. Amongst the Cangin speakers, a sub-group of the Serers, Roog is known as Koox.

Use as a term of abuse
The term "polytheist" is sometimes used by Sunni Muslim extremist groups such as Islamic State of Iraq and the Levant (ISIL) as a derogatory reference to Shiite Muslims, whom they view as having "strayed from Islam's monotheistic creed because of the reverence they show for historical figures, like Imam Ali".

Polydeism

Polydeism (from the Greek πολύ poly ("many") and Latin deus meaning god) is a portmanteau referencing a polytheistic form of deism, encompassing the belief that the universe was the collective creation of multiple gods, each of whom created a piece of the universe or multiverse and then ceased to intervene in its evolution. This concept addresses an apparent contradiction in deism, that a monotheistic God created the universe, but now expresses no apparent interest in it, by supposing that if the universe is the construct of many gods, none of them would have an interest in the universe as a whole.

Creighton University Philosophy professor William O. Stephens, who has taught this concept, suggests that C. D. Broad projected this concept in Broad's 1925 article, "The Validity of Belief in a Personal God". Broad noted that the arguments for the existence of God only tend to prove that "a designing mind had existed in the past, not that it does exist now. It is quite compatible with this argument that God should have died long ago, or that he should have turned his attention to other parts of the Universe", and notes in the same breath that "there is nothing in the facts to suggest that there is only one such being". Stephens contends that Broad, in turn, derived the concept from David Hume. Stephens states:

This use of the term appears to originate at least as early as Robert M. Bowman Jr.'s 1997 essay, Apologetics from Genesis to Revelation. Bowman wrote:

Sociologist Susan Starr Sered used the term in her 1994 book, Priestess, Mother, Sacred Sister: Religions Dominated by Women, which includes a chapter titled, "No Father in Heaven: Androgyny and Polydeism". She writes that she has "chosen to gloss on 'polydeism' a range of beliefs in more than one supernatural entity". Sered used this term in a way that would encompass polytheism, rather than exclude much of it, as she intended to capture both polytheistic systems and nontheistic systems that assert the influence of "spirits or ancestors". This use of the term, however, does not accord with the historical misuse of deism as a concept to describe an absent creator god.

See also 

 Animism
 Ethnic religion
 Hellenismos
 Judgement of Paris
 Monolatry
 Pantheism 
 Panentheism
 Polytheistic reconstructionism
 Shirk (polytheism)
 West African Vodun
 Henotheism
 Kathenotheism

References

Further reading
 Assmann, Jan, 'Monotheism and Polytheism' in: Sarah Iles Johnston (ed.), Religions of the Ancient World: A Guide, Harvard University Press (2004), pp. 17–31.
 Burkert, Walter, Greek Religion: Archaic and Classical, Blackwell (1985), . 
 Greer, John Michael; A World Full of Gods: An Inquiry Into Polytheism, ADF Publishing (2005), 
 Iles Johnston, Sarah; Ancient Religions, Belknap Press (September 15, 2007), 
 Paper, Jordan; The Deities are Many: A Polytheistic Theology, State University of New York Press (March 3, 2005), 
 Penchansky, David, Twilight of the Gods: Polytheism in the Hebrew Bible (2005), .
Swarup, Ram, & Frawley, David (2001). The word as revelation: Names of gods. New Delhi: Voice of India.

External links

The Association of Polytheist Traditions – APT, a UK-based community of Polytheists.
International Year Of Polytheism Philosophical project promoting polytheism by group monochrom
Integrational Polytheism